The Whitworth Institute is a Grade II listed building in Darley Dale, Derbyshire.

It was funded by the estate of the late Sir Joseph Whitworth who lived in nearby Stancliffe Hall. The building is constructed of Staincliffe stone with green Westmorland slate. By the end of May 1890 the builders had finished work, and the joiners had moved into the interior. The building cost about £15,000. and although completed by September 1890, was not formally opened until May 1891.

The Whitworth Institute was given to the people of Darley Dale and in 2009/10 underwent a £1.7m renovation to ensure its continued use for future generations.

See also
Listed buildings in Darley Dale

References

Whitworth
Buildings and structures completed in 1890